Sam Caird (born 18 March 1997) is a New Zealand rugby union player who plays for  in the Bunnings NPC. His position is lock. He was part of the  squad in 2020 but did not play.

Reference list

External links
itsrugby.co.uk profile

1997 births
New Zealand rugby union players
Living people
Rugby union locks
Waikato rugby union players
Northland rugby union players
Blues (Super Rugby) players
New South Wales Waratahs players
Highlanders (rugby union) players
Hanazono Kintetsu Liners players